The following is a timeline of the history of the city of Atlanta, Georgia, United States.

19th century

 1821 – Creek Indians cede land that is now Metro Atlanta per treaty.
 1839 – Settlement of "Terminus" established (at what would be end of Western and Atlantic Railroad).
 1843 – Town of Marthasville incorporated.
 1845
 Georgia Railroad (Augusta-Marthasville) begins operating.
 Marthasville renamed "Atlanta."
 1846 – Macon & Western RR connects Atlanta with port of Savannah.
 1847 – Town of Atlanta incorporated.
 1848 - Moses Formwalt becomes mayor.
 1849 - Benjamin Bomar becomes mayor.
 1850
 Population: 2,572
 Atlanta Cemetery founded.
 1851 - Western and Atlantic Railroad connects Atlanta to The Midwest.
 1852 - Atlanta & West Point Railroad built.
 1853 - Atlanta becomes seat of Fulton County.
 1855
 Atlanta Medical College established.
 Gas lighting installed in city.
 1860
 Population: 9,554.
 William Ezzard becomes mayor (1860 - 1861).
 1861
 Jared Whitaker becomes mayor (1861 - 1861  - joined CSA government).
 Thomas Lowe becomes mayor (1861 - 1862).
 1864
 James Calhoun becomes mayor (1862 - 1866).
 May–September: Union forces wage Atlanta Campaign.
 September 2: Union forces take city.
 November 15: Burning of Atlanta by Union forces.
 Nov. 26: Col. Luther J. Glenn is appointed commander of the Atlanta Post.
 Dec. 5: Cap. Thomas L. Dodd is appointed the Provost-Marshal.
 Dec 7: Gen. W. P. Howard sends his report to Governor Brown on the destruction of Atlanta.
 1865
 Civil War ends; slaves freed.
 Atlanta University, first Atlanta black college, founded.
 1867 - Young Men's Library Association founded.
 1868
 Atlanta becomes Georgia state capital.
 Constitution newspaper begins publication.
 1869 - Clark College founded.
 1870 - Population: 21,789.
 1871
 Horse-drawn streetcar begins operating.
 Public school system organized.
 1877 - Washington Seminary established.
 1878 - Southern Medical College established.
 1879
 Augusta Institute moves from Augusta to Atlanta and is renamed Atlanta Baptist Seminary.
 Atlanta Building and Loan Association established.
 1880
 Abyssinian Library established.
 Population: 37,409; Atlanta surpasses Savannah as Georgia's largest city.
 1881
 Atlanta Baptist Female Seminary and Morris Brown Colored College founded.
 International Cotton Exposition held.
 1882 - Atlanta Fire Rescue Department established.
 1883
 Atlanta Journal newspaper begins publication.
 Capital City Club established.
 1885 - Georgia Institute of Technology founded.
 1886
 Ebenezer Baptist Church founded.
 Atlanta goes "dry".
 Coca-Cola beverage introduced.
 1887
 Piedmont Exposition held.
 Piedmont Driving Club and Inman Park (first garden suburb) founded.
 Coca-Cola invents the coupon.
 1888 - Atlanta Camera Club organized.
 1889
 First electric streetcars enable further expansion of city.
 Georgia State Capitol building opens.
 Grant Park and Atlanta Zoo established.
 Fulton Bag and Cotton Mills is incorporated.
 1890 - Population: 65,533.
 1891 - Atlanta Consolidated Street Railway in business.
 1892 - Grady Memorial Hospital opens.
 1895
 Cotton States and International Exposition held.
 September: Booker T. Washington gives "Atlanta Compromise" Speech.
 Atlanta Woman's Club founded.
 1896 - Atlanta Conference of the Study of Negro Problems begins.
 1899 - Federal penitentiary established.
 1900 - Population: 89,872; metro 419,375.

1900s-1940s

 1901 - Atlanta Theological Seminary established.
 1902 - Carnegie Library opens.
 1904 - Atlanta Art Association formed.
 1905
 Atlanta School of Medicine and Associated Charities of Atlanta founded.
 Atlanta Mutual Insurance Association in business.
 1906 - September 22: Atlanta Race Riot kills 27.
 1907 - Atlanta Conservatory of Music founded.
 1908 - Atlanta Neighborhood Union organized.
 1909 - Architectural Arts League of Atlanta organized.
 1910
 Population: 154,839; metro 522,442.
 Restaurants segregated; other Jim Crow laws follow.
 1911 - Atlanta Debutante Club founded.
 1913
 Georgia Tech starts "evening college", now Georgia State.
 Augusta Institute established founded in 1867 is renamed Morehouse College.
 1914
 Federal Reserve Bank of Atlanta established.
 1914–1915 Fulton Bag and Cotton Mills strike.
 1915
 Emory College relocated to Atlanta.
 November: film The Birth of a Nation premieres.
 Ku Klux Klan refounded in Atlanta.
 1916
 Streetcar strike.
 Utopian  Literary Club and Atlanta Junior League founded.
 1917 - Great Atlanta fire.
 1918 - 1918 influenza epidemic.
 1919 - Commission on Interracial Cooperation active.
 1920
 Butler Street YMCA opens.
 Population: 200,616; metro 622,283.
 1921 - Atlanta Junior Chamber (JCI Atlanta) established.
 1922 - WSB radio begins broadcasting.
 1923 - Spring Street Viaduct opens, downtown rises above train tracks.
 1926 - Atlanta Historical Society founded.
 1927 - Atlanta Historical Bulletin begins publication.
 1928 - Atlanta World newspaper begins publication.
 1929
 Atlanta University Center Consortium established.
 City Hall built.
 January 15: Martin Luther King, Jr. is born.
 WGST radio begins broadcasting.
 1930 - Population: 270,366; metro 715,391.
 1931 - WATL radio begins broadcasting.
 1933 - Georgia Municipal Association headquartered in city.
 1935 - Cascade Theatre opens.
 1936
 Atlanta Dogwood Festival begins.
 William B. Hartsfield elected mayor.
 Techwood Homes built, first public housing in US.
 1937 - WAGA radio begins broadcasting.
 1939
 Plaza Theatre opens.
 Gone with the Wind world premiere draws 300,000 to streets.
 1940
 Euclid Theatre opens.
 Population: 302,288.
 1941 - Central Atlanta Progress established.
 1944
 Atlanta Campaign National Historic Site established.
 Southern Regional Council and Associated Klans of Georgia headquartered in city.
 1945 - Mary Mac's Tea Room in business.
 1946
 U.S. Centers for Disease Control and Prevention founded.
 December 7: Winecoff Hotel fire.
 1947 - Regional Metropolitan Planning Commission established.
 1948 - WSB-TV (television) begins broadcasting.
 1949
 WAGA-TV and WERD-AM radio begin broadcasting.
 Atlanta Negro Voters League founded.
 Last streetcar line converted to trolleybus.

1950s-1990s

 1950
 Population: 331,314; metro 997,666.
 Transit strike, Atlanta Transit Co. takes over transit from Georgia Railway and Power.
 1952 - Georgia Board of Regents, votes to allow women into Georgia Tech.
 1952 - Buckhead annexed.
 1953 - Links chapter established.
 1956 - 1956 Sugar Bowl first black player to play in a college bowl game in deep south causes riots.
 1956 - Alexander Memorial Coliseum opens.
 1957 - Southern Christian Leadership Conference headquartered in city.
 1958
 October 12: Hebrew Benevolent Congregation Temple bombing.
 Atlanta Masjid of Al-Islam established.
 1959 - Trolleybuses, buses, public library desegregated.
 Lenox Square mall opens.
 Metro population hits 1 million.
 1960
 Population: 487,455; metro 1,312,474.
 March 15: An Appeal for Human Rights is released.
 Sit-ins at Rich's lunch counters during the Civil Rights Movement.
 Atlanta Inquirer newspaper begins publication.
 1961
 Ivan Allen, Jr. becomes mayor.
 Public schools begin token desegregation.
 Rich's desegregates restaurant.
 John Portman opens Merchandise Mart, kicking off transformation of downtown.
 One Park Tower built.
 1962
 Peyton Road barricades built in Cascade Heights.
 106 Atlanta art patrons die in Paris air crash.
 1963
 Atlanta Marathon begins.
 Trolleybuses converted en masse to buses.
 1964
 U.S. Supreme Court decides Heart of Atlanta Motel, Inc. v. United States.
 Atlanta Press Club and Atlanta Track Club established.
 1965 – Atlanta–Fulton County Stadium constructed.
 1966 
 State of Georgia Building constructed.
 Both the relocated Atlanta Braves of Major League Baseball and the expansion Atlanta Falcons of the National Football League begin play at Atlanta–Fulton County Stadium.
 1967
 Atlanta Chiefs soccer team begins play.
 Sister city relationship established with Salzburg, Austria.
 1968
 King Center for Nonviolent Social Change founded.
 Peach Bowl annual football game begins.
 Atlanta Hawks basketball team relocates to Atlanta.
 Equitable Building constructed.
 1969
 Coronet Theater and Perimeter freeway open.
 Afro-American Police League chapter established.
 1970
 Peachtree Road Race begins.
 Population: 496,973; metro 1,763,626
 1971
 Atlanta Gay Pride Festival established.
 International flights begin at Hartsfield Airport.
 1972 
 Sister city relationships established with Montego Bay, Jamaica; and Rio de Janeiro, Brazil.
 The Atlanta Flames are established as an expansion team of the National Hockey League.
 The Omni Coliseum opens as the new home of the NBA's Hawks and NHL's Flames.
 1973
 Maynard Jackson becomes first black mayor of Atlanta.
 GSU Sports Arena open.
 1974
 Sevananda Natural Foods Market in business.
 Sister city relationships established with Lagos, Nigeria; Taipei, Taiwan; and Toulouse, France.
 1975 - Centennial Tower built.
 1976
 Atlanta Botanical Garden established.
 Atlanta Film Festival begins.
 Georgia World Congress Center opens.
 National Conference of Black Mayors headquartered in city.
 1977
 Atlanta Soto Zen Center founded.
 Sister city relationship established with Newcastle upon Tyne, United Kingdom.
 1979
 Metropolitan Atlanta Rapid Transit Authority begins operating.
 Atlanta murders of 1979–1981 begin.
 1980
 Population: 425,022; metro 2,233,324.
 All-news television network CNN begins broadcasting; Turner empire takes off.
 Al-Farooq Masjid (mosque) and Martin Luther King, Jr., National Historic Site established.
 Flames hockey team sold and relocated to Calgary, Alberta.
 1981
 Atlanta Gay Men's Chorus founded.
 Sister city relationship established with Daegu, South Korea.
 1982
 Andrew Young becomes mayor.
 Carter Center headquartered in Atlanta.
 1983
 Atlanta–Fulton Public Library System established.
 Sister city relationship established with Brussels, Belgium.
 1984 - Sweet Auburn Heritage Festival begins.
 1986
 Jimmy Carter Library and Museum dedicated.
 Midtown Assistance Center established.
 1987
 John Lewis becomes U.S. representative for Georgia's 5th congressional district.
 Sister city relationship established with Port of Spain, Trinidad and Tobago.
 1988
 Democratic Convention.
 Sister city relationship established with Tbilisi, Georgia.
 1990 - Population: 394,017; metro 2,959,950.
 1991
 Atlanta Bicycle Coalition organized.
 Land bank established.
 Drepung Loseling Institute opens.
 1992
 6 September: Georgia Dome opens.
 SunTrust Plaza and Bank of America Plaza built.
 1994 - Sister city relationships established with Bucharest, Romania; and Ancient Olympia, Greece.
 1995
 October 28: Atlanta Braves baseball team wins 1995 World Series.
 Atlanta Downtown Improvement District established.
 Sister city relationship established with Cotonou, Benin.
 1996
 Centennial Olympic Park opens.
 18 May: Centennial Olympic Stadium opens.
 19 July–4 August: 1996 Summer Olympics held.
 July 27: Centennial Olympic Park bombing.
 16-25 August: 1996 Summer Paralympics held.
 24 October: Atlanta–Fulton County Stadium closed.
 Sister city relationship established with Salcedo, Dominican Republic.
 1997 
 Centennial Olympic Stadium reconstructed as Turner Field.
 2 August: Atlanta–Fulton County Stadium demolished and parking space built for Turner Field.
 1998
 City website online (approximate date).
 Sister city relationship established with Nuremberg, Germany.
 1999
 Philips Arena opens.
 Atlanta Thrashers ice hockey team begins play.
 2000
 Freedom Park dedicated.
 Sister city relationship established with Ra'anana, Israel.
 Population: 416,474; metro 4,112,198.

20th century

2000s
 2001 - The Atlanta Journal-Constitution newspaper in publication.
 2002 - Shirley Franklin becomes mayor.
 2003 - Fermi Project established.
 2004 - Atlanta Rollergirls established.
 2005
 Airport becomes world's busiest.
 Sister city relationship established with Fukuoka, Japan.
 2008
 Delta becomes world's largest airline.
 March 14–15: 2008 Atlanta tornado outbreak.

2010s
 2010 - Population: 420,003; metro 5,268,860.
 2011
 Thrashers hockey team are sold and relocated to Winnipeg, Manitoba, becoming the new Winnipeg Jets.
 Atlanta Public Schools cheating scandal investigative report issued.
 Atlanta first US city to demolish all public housing projects.
 2012 - Part of BeltLine path opens.
 2014 - National Center for Civil and Human Rights opens.
 2015 - Population: 463,875 (estimate).
 2016 
 Murder Kroger closes.
 Turner Field hosts its last baseball game, with the Braves moving to a new ballpark, SunTrust Park, in Cobb County.
 2017 
 Georgia Dome closes.
 Atlanta United FC begins play in Major League Soccer.
 Interstate 85 bridge collapse occurs.
 Turner Field reconstructed as Georgia State Stadium.
 Mercedes-Benz Stadium opens.
 2018
 Hackers successfully breach the city's servers, encrypting files with ransomware and disrupting services.

2020s
 2021 - 
 The Atlanta spa shootings occur.
 The Atlanta Braves baseball team win the 2021 World Series.

See also
 History of Atlanta
 List of mayors of Atlanta
 Timeline of mass transit in Atlanta
 Timelines of other cities in Georgia: Athens, Augusta, Columbus, Macon, Savannah
 Sister city timelines: Brussels, Bucharest, Cotonou, Fukuoka, Lagos, Nuremberg, Rio de Janeiro, Salzburg, Tbilisi, Toulouse

References

Bibliography

Published in 19th century
1860s-1870s
 
 
 
 
 
 
 
 
1880s-1890s

Published in 20th century
1900s-1940s
 
 
 ; v.2
 
 
  1904
 1908 ed.
 
 
 

 
 
 
 
 

1950s-1990s
 
 
 
 
 
 
 
  (fulltext via Open Library)
 
 
 Robert D. Bullard et al., eds (2000). Sprawl City: Race, Politics, and Planning in Atlanta. Washington, DC: Island Press.

Published in 21st century

 
 
 
 
 
  (About economic aspects of city)

External links

 
 Digital Public Library of America. Items related to Atlanta, various dates.
 Europeana. Items related to Atlanta, Georgia, various dates.
Stuart A. Rose Manuscript, Archives, and Rare Book Library, Emory University: Utopian Literary Club (Atlanta, Ga.) records, 1927-2004

Atlanta
Years in Georgia (U.S. state)